Martin's Mill Covered Bridge was a historic covered bridge west of Marianna, Pennsylvania over Ten Mile Creek, in West Bethlehem Township, Washington County, Pennsylvania in the United States.

It is designated as a historic bridge by the Washington County History & Landmarks Foundation. The bridge no longer exists, though its stone wing walls remain.

References

External links

[ National Register nomination form]

Covered bridges on the National Register of Historic Places in Pennsylvania
Covered bridges in Washington County, Pennsylvania
National Register of Historic Places in Washington County, Pennsylvania
Road bridges on the National Register of Historic Places in Pennsylvania
Wooden bridges in Pennsylvania